Hidden Empire is a 2009 science fiction novel by American writer Orson Scott Card. It is the second book (out of two) in the Empire duet.

Reception
It has a rating of 3.62 out of 5 on Goodreads out of 3000 votes

See also
Empire
Shadow Complex
List of works by Orson Scott Card
Orson Scott Card

References

2009 science fiction novels
The Empire Duet
Novels by Orson Scott Card
American fantasy novels
Fantasy novel series
American alternate history novels